Isac Tomé Filipe de Carvalho (born 27 June 1989) is a Mozambican footballer who plays as a forward for Costa do Sol and the Mozambique national football team.

Career

International
Carvalho made his senior international debut on 17 November 2010, scoring Mozambique's lone goal in a 3-1 friendly defeat to Zimbabwe.

Career statistics

International

International Goals
Scores and results list Mozambique's goal tally first.

References

External links

1989 births
Living people
Mozambican footballers
Association football forwards
GD Maputo players
Liga Desportiva de Maputo players
C.D. Maxaquene players
CD Costa do Sol players
Sportspeople from Maputo
Moçambola players
Mozambique international footballers
Mozambique A' international footballers
2014 African Nations Championship players
2022 African Nations Championship players